Elundini Local Municipality is an administrative area in the Joe Gqabi District Municipality of the Eastern Cape in South Africa.

The name originates from isiZulu and it refers to the Drakensberg Mountains.

Main places
The 2001 census divided the municipality into the following main places:

Politics 

The municipal council consists of thirty-four members elected by mixed-member proportional representation. Seventeen councillors are elected by first-past-the-post voting in seventeen wards, while the remaining seventeen are chosen from party lists so that the total number of party representatives is proportional to the number of votes received. In the election of 1 November 2021 the African National Congress (ANC) won a majority of twenty-eight seats on the council.
The following table shows the results of the election.

References

External links
 http://www.elundini.org.za/

Local municipalities of the Joe Gqabi District Municipality